Muscocyclops is a genus of copepod crustaceans in the family Cyclopidae, comprising three species found only in South America. Two of the species – Muscocyclops bidentatus Reid, 1987 and Muscocyclops therasiae Reid, 1987 – are endemic to the Distrito Federal in Brazil, and are listed as conservation dependent on the IUCN Red List. The third species is Muscocyclops operculatus (Chappuis, 1917).

References

Cyclopidae
Cyclopoida genera
Freshwater crustaceans of South America
Taxonomy articles created by Polbot